Cyphoprosopa is a genus of flies in the family Stratiomyidae.

Species
Cyphoprosopa lindneri James, 1975

References

Stratiomyidae
Brachycera genera
Monotypic Brachycera genera
Diptera of Africa